In Norse mythology, Hlaðguðr svanhvít (Old Norse Hlaðguðr "swan-white") is a valkyrie. Hlaðguðr svanhvít is attested in the Poetic Edda poem Völundarkviða as the sister of the valkyrie Hervör alvitr (both daughters of King Hlödvér), and as the seven-year wife of Slagfiðr.

Notes

References

 Simek, Rudolf (2007) translated by Angela Hall. Dictionary of Northern Mythology. D.S. Brewer 
Völundarkviða in Old Norse and English translation

Valkyries